The 36th Texas Cavalry Regiment was a unit of mounted volunteers from Texas that fought in the Confederate States Army during the American Civil War. The regiment was organized in March 1862 at Belton, Texas and surgeon Peter C. Woods was appointed to command it. The unit patrolled the Texas Gulf Coast and then spent the winter of 1862–1863 at Port Lavaca, Texas. It marched to Brownsville, Texas, in spring 1863 and later joined Hamilton P. Bee's brigade. This brigade transferred to Louisiana where it fought at Mansfield, Pleasant Hill, Blair's Landing, and Yellow Bayou during the Red River campaign in 1864. Afterward, the regiment traveled to Crockett, Texas, and then Galveston, where it was present when the men were paroled in June 1865.

See also
List of Texas Civil War Confederate units
Texas in the American Civil War

Notes

References

Units and formations of the Confederate States Army from Texas
1862 establishments in Texas
1865 disestablishments in Texas
Military units and formations disestablished in 1865
Military units and formations established in 1862